Jean-Paul Fouletier (1 July 1939 – 27 August 2016) was a French male weightlifter, who competed in the 110 kg category and represented France at international competitions. He won the bronze medal in the snatch at the 1970 World Weightlifting Championships lifting 152.5 kg. He participated at the 1968 Summer Olympics and at the 1972 Summer Olympics in the 110 kg event.

References

External links

Jean-Paul Fouletier's obituary 

1939 births
2016 deaths
French male weightlifters
World Weightlifting Championships medalists
Sportspeople from Douala
Olympic weightlifters of France
Weightlifters at the 1972 Summer Olympics
Weightlifters at the 1968 Summer Olympics
20th-century French people